Vakil Bazaar is the main bazaar of Shiraz, Iran, located in the historical center of the city.

It is thought that the market originally was established by the Buwayhids in the 11th century AD, and was completed mainly by the Atabaks of Fars, and was renamed after Karim Khan Zand only in the 18th century.

The bazaar has beautiful courtyards, caravansarais, bath houses, and old shops which are deemed among the best places in Shiraz to buy Persian rugs, spices, copper handicrafts and antiques.

Like other Middle Eastern bazaars, there are a few mosques and Imamzadehs constructed beside or behind the bazaar.

See also 
 Iranian architecture

Gallery

References

External links 

 Gallery of the Bazaar

Buildings and structures in Shiraz
Architecture in Iran
Bazaars in Iran
Tourist attractions in Shiraz